Corpuz is the Filipino equivalent of the Spanish and Latin Corpus. Notable people with the surname include:

 Jackson Corpuz (born 1989), Filipino basketball player
 Niña Corpuz (born 1977), Filipino journalist
 Onofre Corpuz (1926–2013), Filipino academic, economist, and historian
 Teddy Corpuz (born 1980), Filipino singer, television presenter, actor, and comedian
 Victoria Tauli-Corpuz (born 1952), Filipino indigenous activist

See also
 Pio V. Corpuz, a 4th class municipality in Masbate, Philippines

Tagalog-language surnames